Yang Xiao (born 6 March 1964) is a female Chinese rower. Together with her teammates, she won a silver medal in women's coxed four, and a bronze medal in women's coxed eight at the 1988 Seoul Olympic Games.

References

Chinese female rowers
Rowers at the 1984 Summer Olympics
Rowers at the 1988 Summer Olympics
Olympic rowers of China
Olympic silver medalists for China
Olympic bronze medalists for China
Living people
1964 births
Olympic medalists in rowing
Asian Games medalists in rowing
Rowers at the 1986 Asian Games
Medalists at the 1988 Summer Olympics
Asian Games gold medalists for China
Medalists at the 1986 Asian Games
20th-century Chinese women
21st-century Chinese women